Françoise Meltzer (born 1947) is a professor of Philosophy of Religion at the University of Chicago Divinity School. She is the Chair of Comparative Literature at the University of Chicago.

Work
Meltzer's scholarship includes work on contemporary critical theory and nineteenth-century French literature. She marshals postmodern critical theories in order to explore literary representations of the subject.

In her book Hot Property: The Stakes and Claims of Literary Originality, she examines the ideas of originality and authorship in a series of case studies from Descartes to Walter Benjamin. In her book on Joan of Arc, she undertakes a study of that figure in relation to subjectivity as it is treated in philosophical and literary theoretical courses.

Meltzer co-edited a Symposium on [God] for the journal Critical Inquiry. With Jas' Elsner, Meltzer co-edited a special issue of Critical Inquiry on theories of saints and sainthood in three monotheistic religions. She is co-editing a book on religion and postmodernist texts, and also working on two monographs; one about 1848 in France, and the concept of rupture from a philosophical, political, and literary point of view; the other about the gendering of subjectivity.

Education
Ph.D. Comparative Literature, University of California, Berkeley, 1975
M.A. Comparative Literature, University of California, Berkeley, 1971
B.A. Ohio University, 1969

Bibliography
(1987) Salome and the Dance of Writing: Portraits of Diegesis in Literature
(1988) The Trial(s) of Psychoanalysis, sed.
(1994) Hot Property: The Stakes and Claims of Literary Originality
(2001) For Fear, Fire:  Joan of Arc and the Limits of Subjectivity
(2011) Double Vision: Baudelaire's Modernity

See also
Deconstruction
List of deconstructionists

References

1947 births
Living people
American literary critics
Women literary critics
Philosophers of religion
University of Chicago faculty
University of Chicago Divinity School faculty
Comparative literature academics
American women critics